Jan Carlos Mateo Delgado (born January 31, 2003) is a Puerto Rican football player who currently plays as a forward for San Cristóbal.

Club career
Mateo started his career with Puerto Rican side GPS San Juan. In 2021, he signed for Bolivian side Oriente Petrolero.

Career statistics

Club

Notes

International

References

2003 births
Living people
Sportspeople from San Juan, Puerto Rico
Puerto Rican footballers
Association football forwards
Association football defenders
Liga Dominicana de Fútbol players
Oriente Petrolero players
CA San Cristóbal players
Puerto Rico youth international footballers
Puerto Rico international footballers
Puerto Rican expatriate footballers
Expatriate footballers in Bolivia
Puerto Rican people of Dominican Republic descent
Sportspeople of Dominican Republic descent
Citizens of the Dominican Republic through descent
Dominican Republic footballers